El Arenosillo Test Centre (CEDEA) is the name of a rocket launch site for suborbital rockets managed by INTA, located near Mazagón in Spain. It is located in the province of Huelva, Andalucía, in the southwest coast of Spain (37.1° N, 6.7° W). CEDEA is adjacent to the Center of Excellence for Unmanned Systems (CEUS).
El Arenosillo is also the location of an autonomous astronomical observatory of the BOOTES network , with two domes and three telescopes.

Equipment

Among the main facilities that INTA has at CEDEA are (updated 2009):
 Two automatic telemetry systems (fixed and mobile) in S and L bands
 HF, UHF and VHF communications systems
 Airborne and maritime surveillance radars, NORTHCONTROL
 Mobile path radar, VITRO RIR 778X, 250 Kw
 Radar path, TRACOR RIR 779C, 1 Mw
 1Mw VITRO RIR 778C mobile path radar with destruction command
 Three autonomous mobile optronic stations, MSP 2000, equipped with IR, TV, cinema and radar sensors (3D, high precision and with telemetric capabilities)
 Weather center with real-time information, satellite data reception and complete radiosonde system
 Control center where all the information necessary for the supervision and monitoring of a launching operation (air traffic control, meteorology, cartography, sensor data integration, flight safety, etc.) is centralized.
 Evaluation center: preparation, analysis and evaluation of reports
 Two high speed cameras (10000 images/s)

Complementing the above, the Center also has:
 Meteorological laboratory and probe balloons
 Presentation and conference room
 Telemetry, radar and optronic workshops
 Mechanical workshop, electrical workshop, sanitary service and warehouses
 Accommodation service for operations
 Laboratory for photographic processing

In 2017 part of the equipment was damaged in a wildfire. In the years 2018 and 2019 INTA has dedicated part of its budget to replace damaged equipment.

Pads
Incomplete list of launch pads:
 Nike –  Operational. Based on a modified Nike Hercules system
 Sermiat – Unoperational. Used for Centaure rockets
 Médano del Loro – Operational. Is an adjacent launch site managed by Spanish Army

Launch history 
The first launch of a rocket from El Arenosillo took place 15 October 1966. Up to 1994 a total of 557 rockets were launched from this base, mainly of the Skua type for atmospheric soundings and in collaboration with other countries.

All rockets for atmospheric soundings in Spain are launched from El Arenosillo.

In 2015 Delft Aerospace Rocket Engineering broke the European altitude record for amateur rocketry by launching the Stratos II+ rocket to 21.5 km altitude from El Arenosillo.

On 1 March 2017, Zero 2 Infinity tested its first rocket, a Bloostar prototype, in El Arenosillo. A balloon took Bloostar to 25 km. At 25 km the ignition of the rocket took place. The goals of the mission were: (i) validation of the telemetry systems in Space conditions, (ii) controlled ignition, (iii) stabilization of the rocket, (iv) monitoring of the launch sequence, (v) parachute deployment, and finally, (vi) sea recovery. All these goals were achieved in full.

In 2022 PLD Space is expected to launch its first rocket Miura 1 from El Arenosillo.

Only some launches are listed here. For information on individual rockets, see the List of rockets launched from El Arenosillo.

References

Buildings and structures in the Province of Huelva
Rocket launch sites
Astronomical observatories in Spain
INTA facilities